This is a list of television broadcasters which provide coverage of the EuroCup, European professional basketball's secondary-tier level continental-wide competition.

Broadcasters

See also 

 List of EuroLeague broadcasters

External links 

 TV Broadcasters at eurocupbasketball.com

References 

EuroCup
EuroCup
Basketball on television